DRC Emergency Services is a hurricane debris removal company headquartered in Mobile, Alabama.

Background 
DRC Emergency Services ("DRC") was founded in 1989 in South Carolina in the aftermath of Hurricane Hugo. The company has performed contracts in most of the hurricane and natural disasters throughout the southeastern United States since 1989. The company was previously owned by Robert Isakson, a former FBI agent, and Thomas Marr Sr.

The company lists its services to include "disaster management, disaster relief services, debris management, technical assistance, project management, temporary workforce housing, life support, construction, construction management, demolition, medical and hazardous waste remediation and disposal, landfill management, civil, heavy and vertical construction."

Other

Custer Battles Qui Tam Suit
DRC was one of the original whistleblowers against Custer Battles, described in a syndicated column as a "poster child" of contractor fraud in Iraq, filing a Qui tam suit alleging fraud in Iraq, and has also been a party to several resulting countersuits by Custer Battles alleging fraud. Allegations and counter-allegations include billing matters and kidnapping charges.  The principal suit was resolved in DRC's favor but the verdict was set aside on the technicality that the Iraqi Coalition Provisional Authority was not a United States government entity and therefore not covered by the False Claims Act. Neither DRC nor its principals have ever been the subjects of any judgements, indictments, or criminal charges in this matter.

Dispute with USAID
DRC is currently a defendant in a suit by the US Justice Department for which alleges fraud against the United States Agency for International Development (USAID) during a contract in support of Hurricane Mitch in Honduras. The suit alleges the falsification of application documents to deceive the US government as to DRC's qualifications and capabilities. The suit also alleges, therefore, that DRC's $12.7M billing was invalid.   As of March 3, 2007 no criminal charges have been filed against DRC and the current status of the investigation is unknown.

Hurricane Katrina
In the wake of Hurricane Katrina, DRC was awarded over a hundred million dollars of contracts. What was once a very small company has now become a very large hurricane contractor having successfully completed more than $100 million in contracts. DRC was awarded a contract by the State of Louisiana to tow cars abandoned after Hurricane Katrina.

Corporate Website 
DRC Emergency Services

Privately held companies based in Alabama